Andrenci is a settlement in the Municipality of Cerkvenjak in northeastern Slovenia. It lies in the Slovene Hills south of Cerkvenjak. The area is part of the traditional region of Styria and is now included in the Drava Statistical Region.

A small chapel-shrine with a wooden belfry in the settlement was built in the 19th century.

Bronze Age and Roman period sites have been identified close to the settlement.

References

External links
Andrenci on Geopedia

Populated places in the Municipality of Cerkvenjak